The 2022–23 Arizona Coyotes season is the 44th season and the National Hockey League (NHL) franchise that was established on June 22, 1979, the 27th season since the franchise relocated from Winnipeg following the 1995–96 NHL season, and the 51st overall season, including the World Hockey Association years. It is their first season playing their home games at Mullett Arena.

Standings

Divisional standings

Conference standings

Schedule and results

Preseason
The team's preseason schedule was released on June 30, 2022.

Regular season
The regular season schedule was released on July 6, 2022.

Player statistics
As of March 15, 2023

Skaters

Goaltenders

†Denotes player spent time with another team before joining the Coyotes. Stats reflect time with the Coyotes only.
‡Denotes player was traded mid-season. Stats reflect time with the Coyotes only.
Bold/italics denotes franchise record.

Roster

Transactions
The Coyotes have been involved in the following transactions during the 2022–23 season.

Key:

 Contract is entry-level.
 Contract initially takes effect in the 2023–24 season.

Trades

Notes:
 Arizona will either receive a 3rd-round pick in 2024 or a 2nd-round pick in 2026 at their own choosing.
 Arizona retains 50% of Bjugstad's salary.

Players acquired

Players lost

Signings

Draft picks

Below are the Arizona Coyotes selections at the 2022 NHL Entry Draft, which were held on July 7 to 8, 2022. It was held at the Bell Centre in Montreal, Quebec.

Notes:
 The San Jose Sharks' first-round pick went to the Arizona Coyotes as the result of a trade on July 7, 2022, that sent Carolina's first-round-pick in 2022 (27th overall), a second-round pick in 2022 (34th overall) and the Islanders' second-round pick in 2022 (45th overall) to San Jose in exchange for this pick.
 The Edmonton Oilers' first-round pick went to the Arizona Coyotes as the result of a trade on July 7, 2022, that sent Colorado's first-round pick in 2022 (32nd overall) to Edmonton in exchange for Zack Kassian, a third-round pick in 2024, a second-round pick in 2025 and this pick.
 The Arizona Coyotes' second-round pick went to the San Jose Sharks as the result of a trade on July 7, 2022, that sent a first-round pick in 2022 (11th overall) to Arizona in exchange for Carolina's first-round pick in 2022 (27th overall), the Islanders' second-round pick in 2022 (45th overall) and this pick.
 The Philadelphia Flyers' second-round pick went to the Arizona Coyotes as the result of a trade on July 22, 2021, that sent future considerations to Philadelphia in exchange for Shayne Gostisbehere, St. Louis' seventh-round pick in 2022 and this pick.
 The San Jose Sharks' second-round pick went to the Arizona Coyotes as the result of a trade on July 17, 2021, that sent Adin Hill and a seventh-round pick in 2022 to San Jose in exchange for Josef Korenar and this pick.
 The Edmonton Oilers' third-round pick went to the Arizona Coyotes as the result of a trade on July 8, 2022, that sent Dallas' third-round pick in 2023 to Chicago in exchange for this pick.
 The Arizona Coyotes' fourth-round pick went to the Winnipeg Jets as the result of a trade on March 21, 2022, that sent Bryan Little and Nathan Smith to Arizona in exchange for this pick.
 The Arizona Coyotes' seventh-round pick went to the San Jose Sharks as the result of a trade on July 17, 2021, that sent Josef Korenar and a second-round pick in 2022 to Arizona in exchange for Adin Hill and this pick.
 The San Jose Sharks' seventh-round pick went to the Arizona Coyotes as the result of a trade on July 8, 2022, that sent Vancouver's seventh-round pick in 2023 to San Jose in exchange for this pick.

References

Arizona Coyotes seasons
2022–23 NHL season by team
2022 in sports in Arizona
Coyotes